Kapil Srivastava (born 23 June) is an Indian guitarist, music author, composer, trainer from New Delhi. Kapil completed his education from DAV Public School and thereafter pursued his graduation in commerce from University of Delhi. He started his career in 1996 as a guitarist and worked for record labels including Sa Re Ga Ma etc.

Kapil apart from being guitar player also established his music concept under the name of Guitarmonk in 2003 which primarily focus on guitar education, music career, live guitar performances and similar products and service initiatives.

Kapil has been taming an interest for music and allied arts since he was 10 years old. His interests comprise music composing, authoring, music education and live guitar concerts. He has authored several books on guitar some of them are as Rudiments of guitar, mastery to guitar scales vol. 1 & 2 etc. & produced instrumental guitar album as Indian Guitaroo vol 1 & vol 2.

He and his team have been training corporate to motivate employees and raise productivity. He has been further playing a major role in counseling schools to consider music education as a serious area rather mere custom.

Compositions 
Kapil Srivastava has composed several guitar compositions. Among them he also improvised India's fastest Bollywood guitar piece Neele Neele Ambar Par, Chura Liya hai tumne on guitar etc. He also composed music, The Journey, for a Bollywood movie Dubai Returns. Guitar duet release with Grammy Winner Vishwa Mohan Bhatt in the year 2016 for the composition Merry Love Rain.

References

External links 

Year of birth missing (living people)
Living people
Indian guitarists
Indian music educators
Music Instructor albums
Indian rock guitarists
Indian rock musicians